Humberto Álvarez (13 June 1929 – 9 June 2019) was a Colombian footballer who played for Atlético Nacional, with whom he won the 1954 Campeonato Profesional.

References

1929 births
2019 deaths
Colombian footballers
Atlético Nacional footballers
Categoría Primera A players
Footballers from Medellín
Colombia international footballers
Association football midfielders
Independiente Medellín managers